Harshad Arora (born 3 September 1987) is an Indian television actor best known for his portrayal of Zain Abdullah in Beintehaa and Adarsh Sinha in Dahleez.

Career

Harshad Arora made his television debut as a male lead in 2014, when he played Zain Abdullah in Colors TV's popular romantic drama show Beintehaa opposite Preetika Rao. Their onscreen chemistry became an instant hit and is still loved by the masses. Beintehaa also earned him several awards including the Indian Television Academy Award, Indian Telly Award and Kalakar Award. The show returned in the year 2016 with the same episodes but a different name, Salaam-E-Ishq Daastaan Mohabbat Ki (transl. Salame Ishq: the story of love") and was broadcast on Colors Rishtey.

This series has also been dubbed in Tamil as Alaipayuthey on Raj TV. The series has also been dubbed in Indonesian and aired on ANTV with the same name Beintehaa. The series has also been dubbed in Turkish language and aired on Kanal 7 channel in the name Benimsin. The series has also been dubbed in South Africa in the name Endless Love on Glow TV. The series has also been dubbed in Bosnia and Herzegovina and aired on OBN TV channel in the name Aaliya. The series has also been dubbed in Tanzania in Swahili language and aired on Azam TV(azam two) with the same name Beintehaa. In 2017, the show was premiered in Afghanistan on Lemar (TV channel) under the title احساس. It was also aired in Arabic by the title صرخة قلب on Sama Dubai. It premiered in Azerbaijan on Dalğa TV in 2018 with the name ƏBƏDİ SEVGİ.

Due to its immense popularity among audiences, Beintehaa was again reaired as "Pyaar Ka Fitoor" from 21 October 2021 and was broadcast on Colors Rishtey, just a month before its 7-year completion anniversary.

In 2015, Arora participated in Colors TV's Fear Factor: Khatron Ke Khiladi 6.

In 2016, he played  Adarsh Sinha, an IAS officer in Star Plus's legal drama Dahleez.

From 2016 to 2017, Arora played Jai in Life OK's supernatural drama SuperCops vs Supervillains.

In 2018, he played Angad in Star Bharat's fantastic series Mayavi Maling.

In 2019, Arora played Alok in SAB TV's Tera Kya Hoga Alia.

From August 2021 to March 2022 he portrayed antagonist Arjun Chatterjee in Colors TV's Thoda Sa Badal Thoda Sa Paani.

Since March 2023 he is portraying lead Dr. Satya Adhikari opposite Ayesha Singh in StarPlus's Ghum Hai Kisikey Pyaar Meiin.

Filmography

Television

Guest appearances

Web series

Awards and nominations

See also 
 List of Indian television actors

References

External links 
 

21st-century Indian male actors
Indian male models
Indian male soap opera actors
Indian male television actors
Living people
Male actors from Mumbai
Male actors from Delhi
1987 births